2017 ICC World Cricket League Division Three was a cricket tournament that took place in Uganda between 23 and 30 May 2017.  The matches took place in Lugogo, Kyambogo and Entebbe. The top two teams, Oman and Canada, were promoted to Division Two. The final ended as a no result due to rain, and therefore Oman won the tournament by virtue of finishing top of the group stage table.

Three countries bid to host the tournament – Canada, Malaysia, and Uganda. In October 2016, the International Cricket Council (ICC) approved a proposal for the tournament to be held in Uganda, subject to security arrangements and costs. Two ICC officials toured the country in December 2016, meeting with the country's First Lady, Janet Museveni, and Prime Minister, Ruhakana Rugunda. Museveni pledged government support for the tournament.

Teams
The following teams qualified:

 (5th in 2015 ICC World Cricket League Division Two)
 (6th in 2015 ICC World Cricket League Division Two)
 (3rd in 2014 ICC World Cricket League Division Three)
 (4th in 2014 ICC World Cricket League Division Three)
 (1st in 2016 ICC World Cricket League Division Four)
 (2nd in 2016 ICC World Cricket League Division Four)

Venues
The following three venues were used for the tournament:
 Lugogo Cricket Oval, Lugogo Stadium, Kampala
 Kyambogo Cricket Oval, Kyambogo University, Kampala
 Entebbe Cricket Oval, Entebbe

Preparation
The United States held a selection camp in Houston, Texas in March with 50 players, including three players with first-class experience; Ibrahim Khaleel, Roy Silva and Camilus Alexander. The United States also participated in a six-day pre-tour in South Africa, immediately prior to the start of the tournament. Prior to the tournament, Malaysia played in the 2017 ACC Emerging Teams Asia Cup, Canada played warm-up matches in Barbados and Uganda invited Kenya to play five 50-over matches. Canada also played three warm-up matches in Zimbabwe.

Squads
The following players were selected for the tournament:

Fahad Babar was originally named in the United States squad, but was replaced by Sagar Patel, after failing to recover from a hand injury suffered during the team's Los Angeles training camp.

Points table

Round-robin

Playoffs

Fifth-place playoff

Third-place playoff

Final

Final standings

References

External links
 Series home at ESPN Cricinfo

2017, 3
International cricket competitions in 2017
2017 in Ugandan cricket
International cricket competitions in Uganda